Little Secrets (Perl oder Pica) is a 2006 Luxembourgish film directed by Pol Cruchten. It was Luxembourg's submission to the 80th Academy Awards for the Academy Award for Best Foreign Language Film, but was not accepted as a nominee.

See also

Cinema of Luxembourg
List of submissions to the 80th Academy Awards for Best Foreign Language Film

References

External links

2006 films
2006 drama films
Films directed by Pol Cruchten
Luxembourgian drama films